Segarcea-Vale is a commune in Teleorman County, Muntenia, Romania. It is composed of three villages: Olteanca, Segarcea-Deal and Segarcea-Vale.

Natives
 Gheorghe Sarău, linguist
 Dimitrie Stelaru, poet and novelist

References

Communes in Teleorman County
Localities in Muntenia